Boo, Zino & The Snurks (also known as Back to Gaya and as The Snurks) is a 2004 German-Spanish CGI animated film directed by Lenard Fritz Krawinkel and Holger Tappe.

Voice cast 
 Michael Herbig: Boo
 Vanessa Petruo: Alanta
 Sebastian Höffner: Zeck
 Torsten Münchow: Zino
 Wolfgang Völz: Mayor
 Claudia Lössl: E.N.I.A.C.

Brazilian voice actors 
 Wellington Muniz: Boo
 Sabrina Sato: Alanta
 Márcio Garcia: Zino
 Marcos Chiesa: Galger
 Carlos Alberto da Silva: Bramph
 Rodrigo Scarpa: Zeck
 Antônio Moreno: Albert Droolinger
 Carlos Silveira: Dr. N. Icely
 Alessandra Araújo: E.N.I.A.C.
 Emerson Camargo: Mayor
 Cecília Lemes: Susi
 Leonardo Camillo: Fred
 Silvia Suzy Pereira: Valerie
 Sérgio Moreno: Chad

English voice actors 
 Alan Marriott: Boo
 Emily Watson: Alanta
 Glenn Wrage: Zino
 John Schwab: Zeck
 Patrick Stewart: Albert Drollinger
 Bob Saker: Mayor
 Stephan Lander: Dr. N. Icely
 John Guerrasio: Galger
 Redd Pepper: Bramph
 Dan Russell: Chad, Fred
 Kate Robbins: Valerie. Female Gayan
 Lorelei King: Female Gayan

German voice actors 
 Michael Herbig: Boo
 Vanessa Petruo: Alanta
 Sebastian Höffner: Zeck
 Torsten Münchow: Zino
 Wolfgang Völz: Mayor
 Claudia Lössl: E.N.I.A.C.

External links 

2004 animated films
2004 films
2004 computer-animated films
German animated films
Spanish animated films
Warner Bros. animated films
Warner Bros. films
Films scored by Michael Kamen
2000s American films
2000s German films